Denijs Paul Beck Morkel (25 January 1906 – 6 October 1980) was a South African cricketer who played for Western Province from 1924 and in 16 Test matches for South Africa from 1927–28 to 1931–32.

References

1906 births
1980 deaths
South Africa Test cricketers
South African cricketers
Western Province cricketers
Gentlemen cricketers
Marylebone Cricket Club cricketers
Gentlemen of England cricketers
H. D. G. Leveson Gower's XI cricketers
Cricketers from Cape Town